Vành Đai 3 station is a metro station that's located in Thanh Xuân, Hanoi.

The station name literally means "Ring Road 3" because it is next to the Ring Road No.3 of Hanoi.

Station layout

Line 2A

Notes

References

External links
Vành Đai 3 Station

Hanoi Metro stations